Qingtian, is a county in southeastern Zhejiang Province, on the middle-lower reaches of the Ou River which flows 388 kilometers (241 mi) before finally reaching the city of Wenzhou and emptying into the East China Sea. The county is known from AD 711 on and was named for its rich rice paddy fields. Subtropical monsoon climate: annual average temperature , annual rainfall . Hilly territory with many ravines. Its capital is Hecheng, also known as Qingtian City. The inhabitants speak Wenzhounese and Qingtianese, both Wu dialects.

Before 1963, when Qingtian county was ruled by the central government to go under the administration of Lishui, the area had been organised under Wenzhou from 323-1963 AD, a total of 1640 years. The area is well known by its traditional stonecarving industry, that has been defined as "embroidery on stone" since the Northern and Southern dynasties period at least.

Administrative divisions
Towns:
Hecheng (鹤城镇), Wenxi (温溪镇), Dongyuan (东源镇), Chuanliao (船寮镇), Beishan (北山镇), Shankou (山口镇), Haikou (海口镇), Gaohu (高湖镇), Lakou (腊口镇), Renzhuang (仁庄镇)

Townships:
Zhangcun Township (章村乡), Shuqiao Township (舒桥乡), Gui'ao Township (贵岙乡), Shixi Township (石溪乡), Zhenbu Township (祯埠乡), Zhenwang Township (祯旺乡), Wanshan Township (万山乡), Huangyang Township (黄垟乡), Jizhai Township (季宅乡), Haixi Township (海溪乡), Gaoshi Township (高市乡), Jupu Township (巨浦乡), Wanfu Township (万阜乡), Tangyang Township (汤垟乡), Fangshan Township (方山乡), Wukeng Township (吴坑乡), Renguan Township (仁宫乡), Zhangdan Township (章旦乡), Fushan Township (阜山乡), Linggen Township (岭根乡), Xiaozhoushan Township (小舟山乡)

Climate

Transportation
Qingtian is served by the Jinhua–Wenzhou high-speed railway.

Notable people
 Chen Cheng, National Revolutionary Army commander, Vice President and Premier of Taiwan
 Chen Li-an, electrical engineer, mathematician and Taiwanese politician
 Chen Muhua, Communist revolutionary and People's Republic of China politician
 Xia Chao, civil governor of Zhejiang 1924–1926
 Zhang Naiqi, People's Republic of China politician
 Shifuku Oh (Wang Shifu), chef, father of Japanese baseball player Sadaharu Oh

See also
Qingtian dialect

References

 
County-level divisions of Zhejiang
Lishui